William Phillips Eadie (born 1882 – 1931) was a Scottish footballer who played for Greenock Overton, Morton, Manchester City and Derby County as a centre-half.

He played for Manchester City between 1906 and 1914, appearing more than 200 times in Football League and FA Cup matches. He later made 31 appearances for Derby County.

References

1880s births
Date of birth missing
1931 deaths
Date of death missing
Footballers from Greenock
Scottish footballers
Association football central defenders
Manchester City F.C. players
Greenock Morton F.C. players
Derby County F.C. players
English Football League players
Scottish Football League players